Leccinum is a genus of fungi in the family Boletaceae. It was the name given first to a series of fungi within the genus Boletus, then erected as a new genus last century. Their main distinguishing feature is the small, rigid projections (scabers) that give a rough texture to their stalks. The genus name was coined from the Italian Leccino, for a type of rough-stemmed bolete. The genus has a widespread distribution, especially in north temperate regions, and contains about 75 species.

Ecology and habitat

Leccinum species are generally found in the woodlands of Eurasia, and North America, forming ectomycorrhizal associations with  trees.  Most Leccinum species are mycorrhizal specialists, associating with trees of a single genus.  Leccinum aurantiacum is an exception, however, occurring in mycorrhizal association with birch, poplar, and oak.

Culinary value
They have generally been presumed to be edible for the most part, but there are reports of poisoning after eating unidentified members of the genus in North America, even after thorough cooking.  The orange- to red-capped species, including L. insigne, are suspected.  Species of Leccinum often cause nausea when consumed raw.

Species 

There are around 75 species including:

References

External links 

  Includes key.
  Includes key to North American species.
   Includes Leccinum species.

 
Boletales genera